

Events

Births

April births 
 April 9 – Isambard Kingdom Brunel, founder of Great Western Railway, is born (d. 1859).

December births 
 December 19 – Benjamin Henry Latrobe, II, designer of Baltimore and Ohio Railroad's Thomas Viaduct (still in use today), is born (d. 1878).

Deaths

References